Farmer's Daughter was a Canadian country music group. Farmer's Daughter recorded three studio albums and charted sixteen singles on the Canadian country music charts. Their highest charting single was the Number One song "Cornfields or Cadillacs".

Career
In the spring of 1992, Saskatchewan's Jake Leiske talked Alberta's Shauna Rae Samograd into forming a country music group. Jake and Shauna Rae had toured together before with their family's gospel group when they were 5 and 2 years old, respectively. By the fall of that same year, they joined forces with Manitoba's Angela Kelman, to form Farmer's Daughter.

In 1993, the Vancouver-based group independently released their debut album, Girls Will Be Girls, on Stubble Jumper Music. The album generated seven hits, including "Borderline Angel", "Family Love", "I Wanna Hold You" and a cover of the Dusty Springfield hit "Son of a Preacher Man". Girls Will Be Girls was named Album of the Year by the British Columbia Country Music Association (BCCMA) in 1994, and the group won the Vista Rising Star Award from the Canadian Country Music Association (CCMA) the following year. They swept the 1996 British Columbia Country Music Awards, winning Entertainer of the Year, Group of the Year, as well as Song and Single of the Year awards for "Borderline Angel".

In 1996, Farmer's Daughter signed to Universal Music Canada and released their second album, Makin' Hay, in September. The album went gold in Canada and produced five more hit singles, including "Lonely Gypsy Wind", "Now That I'm On My Own", "You Said" and the top 5 "Cornfields or Cadillacs". They were named Group of the Year by the CCMA in 1997, Best Country Group or Duo at the Juno Awards in 1998, and both Group and Entertainer of the Year by the BCCMA in 1997 and 1998.

In 1997, at WWE's In Your House 16: Canadian Stampede, Farmer's Daughter performed the Canadian National Anthem prior to the Main Event.

Their third album, This Is the Life, was released in October 1998, also by UMG Canada. They took a more hands-on approach, producing the album with Marc Ramaer (k.d. lang). Two singles from the CD reached the Canadian Top 10, "Freeway" and "Blue Horizon". Farmer's Daughter continued their domination at the BCCMA Awards in 1999, winning Entertainer of the Year, Group of the Year, Song of the Year ("Blue Horizon"), Single of the Year ("Blue Horizon") and Album of the Year (This Is The Life).

The group released their greatest hits album, The Best of Farmer's Daughter, in 1999. The CD included 11 of Farmer's Daughter's biggest hits, along with two new songs, "Walkin' In The Sunshine" (#8) and "You And Only You" (#12). They were once again named Entertainer of the Year and Group of the Year by the BCCMA, along with Single of the Year for "Walkin' In The Sunshine".

The original three group members did their last tour in 2001, and did not go public with any information as to why they decided to stop playing together.  All three women went on to work on solo projects and other personal goals.  On June 16, 2008, Farmer's Daughter played an exclusive reunion show at the Winspear Center in Edmonton, Alberta, Canada.

In 2016 the group was inducted into the BC Country Music Hall of Fame

Discography

Studio albums

Compilation albums

Singles

Music videos

Awards

Canadian Country Music Awards
1995
Vista Rising Star

1997
Group or Duo of the Year

Juno Awards
1998
Best Country Group or Duo

British Columbia Country Music Awards
1994
Album of the Year, Girls Will Be Girls

1996
Entertainer of the Year
Group of the Year
Song of the Year, "Borderline Angel"
Single of the Year, "Borderline Angel"

1997
Entertainer of the Year
Group of the Year
Single of the Year, "Cornfields or Cadillacs"

1998
Entertainer of the Year
Group of the Year

1999
Entertainer of the Year
Group of the Year
Song of the Year, "Blue Horizon"
Single of the Year, "Blue Horizon"
Album of the Year, This Is the Life

2000
Entertainer of the Year
Group of the Year
Single of the Year, "Walkin' In The Sunshine"

2002
Group of the Year

References

1993 establishments in British Columbia
2002 disestablishments in British Columbia
Canadian Country Music Association Rising Star Award winners
Canadian country music groups
Juno Award winners
Musical groups established in 1993
Musical groups disestablished in 2002
Musical groups from Vancouver
Canadian Country Music Association Group or Duo of the Year winners